Federation of Turkish Associations UK (FTAUK) is an umbrella organisation founded on 30 May 2002 in the United Kingdom. Its main aims and objectives is to support the approximately 500,000 British Turks (including Turkish Cypriots) to integrate better within British society, as well as to promote the Turkish culture and British-Turkish relations. Its membership is made up of 16 Turkish organisations within the United Kingdom, predominantly based in London.

See also
Turks in the United Kingdom

References

External links
Official website

Turkish diaspora organizations
Non-profit organisations based in the United Kingdom
Organizations established in 2002
2002 establishments in the United Kingdom